Franciosi is an Italian surname. Notable people with it include:

Aisling Franciosi (born 1993), Irish actress
Gianluca Franciosi (born 1991), Italian footballer
Leo Franciosi (born 1932), Sammarinese sports shooter and Olympian

Italian-language surnames